Dedication Music Award (Vietnamese: Giải thưởng Âm nhạc Cống hiến) is an annual music award presented by , a prestigious entertainment newspaper in Viet Nam, to recognize the discoveries and creations contributed to the richness and development of Viet Nam pop music. The award is considered as an "Grammy Award" in Vietnamese music. The first ceremony was held in 2005, with the original name "Pre-Dedicated Music Award".

References

External links

Awards established in 2005
Annual television shows
Vietnamese music awards
2005 establishments in Vietnam